The 2022 San Francisco Giants season was the 140th season for the franchise in Major League Baseball, their 65th year in San Francisco, and their 23rd at Oracle Park. This was the third season under manager Gabe Kapler and also the first season since 2008 without longtime catcher Buster Posey, who retired the previous November.

On December 2, 2021, Commissioner of Baseball Rob Manfred announced a lockout of players, following expiration of the collective bargaining agreement (CBA) between the league and the Major League Baseball Players Association (MLBPA). On March 10, 2022, the MLB and MLBPA agreed to a new collective bargaining agreement, thus ending the lockout. Opening Day took place on April 7. Although MLB previously announced that several series would be cancelled due to the lockout, the agreement provides for a 162-game season, with originally canceled games to be made up via doubleheaders.

After starting the season with a 37–27 record, the Giants would go 44–54 the rest of the season, eliminating them from playoff contention after posting 107 wins the previous year.

Offseason

Lockout 

The expiration of the league's collective bargaining agreement (CBA) with the Major League Baseball Players Association occurred on December 1, 2021 with no new agreement in place. As a result, the team owners voted unanimously to lockout the players stopping all free agency and trades.

The parties came to an agreement on a new CBA on March 10, 2022.

Rule changes 
Pursuant to the new CBA, several new rules were instituted for the 2022 season. The National League will adopt the designated hitter full-time, a draft lottery will be implemented, the postseason will expand from ten teams to twelve, and advertising patches will appear on player uniforms and helmets for the first time.

Transactions
 November 7, 2021 − The Giants declined to exercise their option on RHP Johnny Cueto, allowing him to become a free agent. The Giants exercised the 2022 contract option on IF Wilmer Flores, LHP José Álvarez, and RHP Jay Jackson. The Giants claimed three players off waivers RHP Hunter Harvey from Baltimore Orioles, OF Austin Dean from St. Louis Cardinals, and LHP Joe Palumbo from Texas Rangers.
 November 22, 2021 − The Giants resigned RHP Anthony DeSclafani to a three-year contract.
 November 22, 2021 − The Giants traded RHP Jay Jackson to the Atlanta Braves in exchange for cash considerations, and a player to be named later or additional cash considerations.
 November 30, 2021 − The Giants signed RHP Alex Cobb to a two-year contract with a club option for 2024.
 November 30, 2021 − The Giants avoided arbitration with RHP John Brebbia, LHP Jarlin García, and OF Austin Slater agreeing to one-year deals. The Giants tender contracts to arbitration-eligible players OF Mike Yastrzemski, OF Darin Ruf, C Curt Casali, and RHP Dominic Leone. The Giants decline to tender the contracts on OF Luis González, RHP Sam Delaplane, and LHP Joe Palumbo, allowing them to become free agents.
 December 1, 2021 − The Giants resigned LHP Alex Wood to a two-year contract.
 March 14, 2022 − The Giants signed LHP Carlos Rodón to a two-year contract. Rodón can opt out of the contract after one year.

Season standings

National League West

National League Wild Card

Record vs. opponents

Game log

|- style="background:#bfb;"
| 1 || April 8 || Marlins || 6–5  || Álvarez (1–0) || Bass (0–1) || — || Oracle Park || 40,853 || 1–0
|- style="background:#fbb;"
| 2 || April 9 || Marlins || 1–2 || Okert (1–0) || McGee (0–1) || Bender (1) || Oracle Park || 38,885 || 1–1
|- style="background:#bfb;"
| 3 || April 10 || Marlins || 3–2 || García (1–0) || Rogers (0–1) || Leone (1) || Oracle Park || 37,332 || 2–1
|- style="background:#fbb;"
| 4 || April 11 || Padres || 2–4 || Wilson (2–0) || Rogers (0–1) || Rogers (3) || Oracle Park || 23,279 || 2–2
|- style="background:#bfb;"
| 5 || April 12 || Padres || 13–2 || Cobb (1–0) || Darvish (0–1) || — || Oracle Park || 25,560 || 3–2
|- style="background:#bfb;"
| 6 || April 13 || Padres || 2–1 || Webb (1–0) || Manaea (1–1) || Doval (1) || Oracle Park || 27,197 || 4–2
|- style="background:#bfb;"
| 7 || April 15 || @ Guardians || 4–1 || Rodón (1–0) || Plesac (0–1) || Doval (2) || Progressive Field || 33,469 || 5–2
|- style="background:#bfb;"
| 8 || April 16 || @ Guardians || 4–2 || Leone (1–0) || Sandlin (0–1) || McGee (1) || Progressive Field || 13,187 || 6–2
|- style="background:#bfb;"
| 9 || April 17 || @ Guardians || 8–1 || Wood (1–0) || Civale (0–1) || — || Progressive Field || 9,620 || 7–2
|- style="background:#bbb;" 
| — || April 18 || @ Mets || colspan=7 | Postponed (rain); Makeup April 19
|- style="background:#fbb;"
| 10 || April 19  || @ Mets || 4–5  || Ottavino (1–0) || García (1–1) || — || Citi Field || rowspan=2 | 27,490 || 7–3
|- style="background:#fbb;"
| 11 || April 19  || @ Mets || 1–3 || Scherzer (3–0) || Webb (1–1) || May (1) || Citi Field || 7–4
|- style="background:#bfb;"
| 12 || April 20 || @ Mets || 5–2 || Rodón (2–0) || Bassitt (2–1) || McGee (2) || Citi Field || 30,050 || 8–4
|- style="background:#fbb;"
| 13 || April 21 || @ Mets || 2–6 || Carrasco (1–0) || DeSclafani (0–1) || — || Citi Field || 28,760 || 8–5
|- style="background:#bfb;"
| 14 || April 22 || @ Nationals || 7–1 || Junis (1–0) || Corbin (0–3) || — || Nationals Park || 23,751 || 9–5
|- style="background:#bfb;"
| 15 || April 23 || @ Nationals || 5–2 || Wood (2–0) || Sanchez (0–1) || Doval (3) || Nationals Park || 27,799 || 10–5
|- style="background:#bfb;"
| 16 || April 24 || @ Nationals || 12–3 || Webb (2–1) || Adon (1–3) || — || Nationals Park || 26,003 || 11–5
|- style="background:#bfb;"
| 17 || April 25 || @ Brewers || 4–2 || McGee (1–1) || Cousins (1–1) || Doval (4) || American Family Field || 21,186 || 12–5
|- style="background:#bfb;"
| 18 || April 26 || Athletics || 8–2 || Rodón (3–0) || Jefferies (1–3) || — || Oracle Park || 32,898 || 13–5
|- style="background:#fbb;"
| 19 || April 27 || Athletics || 0–1 || Blackburn (3–0) || Long (0–1) || Jiménez (4) || Oracle Park || 32,014 || 13–6
|- style="background:#fbb;"
| 20 || April 29 || Nationals || 4–14 || Sanchez (1–1) || Wood (2–1) || — || Oracle Park || 38,256 || 13–7
|- style="background:#bfb;"
| 21 || April 30 || Nationals || 9–3 || Webb (3–1) || Adon (1–4) || — || Oracle Park || 33,241 || 14–7
|-

|- style="background:#fbb;"
| 22 || May 1 || Nationals || 5–11 || Gray (3–2) || Cobb (1–1) || — || Oracle Park || 38,451 || 14–8
|- style="background:#fbb;"
| 23 || May 3 || @ Dodgers || 1–3 || Urías (2–1) || Rodón (3–1) || Kimbrel (5) || Dodger Stadium || 43,370 || 14–9
|- style="background:#fbb;"
| 24 || May 4 || @ Dodgers || 1–9 || Gonsolin (2–0) || Wood (2–2) || — || Dodger Stadium || 52,203 || 14–10
|- style="background:#fbb;"
| 25 || May 5 || Cardinals || 1–7 || Mikolas (2–1) || Littell (0–1) || — || Oracle Park || 22,562 || 14–11
|- style="background:#fbb;"
| 26 || May 6 || Cardinals || 2–3 || Helsley (1–0) || Doval (0–1) || Gallegos (6) || Oracle Park || 28,898 || 14–12
|- style="background:#bfb;"
| 27 || May 7 || Cardinals || 13–7 || Webb (4–1) || Matz (3–2) || — || Oracle Park || 40,113 || 15–12
|- style="background:#bfb;"
| 28 || May 8 || Cardinals || 4–3 || Leone (2–0) || Cabrera (1–1) || Doval (5) || Oracle Park || 38,193 || 16–12
|- style="background:#bfb;"
| 29 || May 9 || Rockies || 8–5 || Rodón (4–1) || Gomber (2–3) || — || Oracle Park || 20,039 || 17–12
|- style="background:#bfb;"
| 30 || May 10 || Rockies || 9–2 || Wood (3–2) || Senzatela (2–2) || — || Oracle Park || 21,472 || 18–12
|- style="background:#bfb;"
| 31 || May 11 || Rockies || 7–1 || Cobb (2–1) || Kuhl (3–1) || — || Oracle Park || 23,341 || 19–12
|- style="background:#bfb;"
| 32 || May 13 || @ Cardinals || 8–2 || Webb (5–1) || Hicks (1–3) || — || Busch Stadium || 39,612 || 20–12
|- style="background:#fbb;"
| 33 || May 14 || @ Cardinals || 0–4 || Hudson (3–2) || Junis (1–1) || — || Busch Stadium || 44,537 || 20–13
|- style="background:#fbb;"
| 34 || May 15 || @ Cardinals || 6–15 || Wainwright (4–3) || Rodón (4–2) || — || Busch Stadium || 39,703 || 20–14
|- style="background:#bfb;"
| 35 || May 16 || @ Rockies || 7–6 || Brebbia (1–0) || Bard (1–2) || Doval (6) || Coors Field || 23,180 || 21–14
|- style="background:#bfb;"
| 36 || May 17 || @ Rockies || 10–7 || Cobb (3–1) || Kuhl (3–2) || Doval (7) || Coors Field || 25,735 || 22–14
|- style="background:#fbb;"
| 37 || May 18 || @ Rockies || 3–5 || Kinley (1–0) || Álvarez (1–1) || Bard (10) || Coors Field || 26,713 || 22–15
|- style="background:#fbb;"
| 38 || May 20 || Padres || 7–8  || García (2–2) || Doval (0–2) || Suárez (1) || Oracle Park || 31,359 || 22–16
|- style="background:#fbb;"
| 39 || May 21 || Padres || 1–2 || Musgrove (5–0) || Rodón (4–3) || Rogers (16) || Oracle Park || 38,916 || 22–17
|- style="background:#fbb;"
| 40 || May 22 || Padres || 1–10 || Gore (3–1) || Wood (3–3) || — || Oracle Park || 35,363 || 22–18
|- style="background:#fbb;"
| 41 || May 23 || Mets || 3–13 || Peterson (2–0) || Cobb (3–2) || — || Oracle Park || 25,690 || 22–19
|- style="background:#bfb;"
| 42 || May 24 || Mets || 13–12 || Brebbia (2–0) || Díaz (1–1) || — || Oracle Park || 27,683 || 23–19
|- style="background:#bfb;"
| 43 || May 25 || Mets || 9–3 || Junis (2–1) || Szapucki (0–1) || — || Oracle Park || 27,432 || 24–19
|- style="background:#fbb;"
| 44 || May 27 || @ Reds || 1–5 || Ashcraft (1–0) || Rodón (4–4) || Warren (3) || Great American Ball Park || 19,000 || 24–20
|- style="background:#fbb;"
| 45 || May 28 || @ Reds || 2–3 || Gutiérrez (1–6) || Wood (3–4) || Santillan (3) || Great American Ball Park || 26,655 || 24–21
|- style="background:#bfb;"
| 46 || May 29 || @ Reds || 6–4 || Brebbia (3–0) || Warren (2–2) || — || Great American Ball Park || 20,439 || 25–21
|- style="background:#bfb;"
| 47 || May 30 || @ Phillies || 5–4  || Leone (3–0) || Bellatti (1–1) || Doval (8) || Citizens Bank Park || 26,650 || 26–21
|- style="background:#bfb;"
| 48 || May 31 || @ Phillies || 7–4  || Álvarez (2–1) || Bellatti (1–2) || — || Citizens Bank Park || 20,927 || 27–21
|-

|- style="background:#fbb;"
| 49 || June 1 || @ Phillies || 5–6 || Nola (3–4) || García (1–2) || Knebel (9) || Citizens Bank Park || 22,213 || 27–22
|- style="background:#fbb;"
| 50 || June 2 || @ Marlins || 0–3 || Alcántara (6–2) || Wood (3–5) || Scott (2) || loanDepot Park || 8,202 || 27–23
|- style="background:#bfb;"
| 51 || June 3 || @ Marlins || 15–6 || Littell (1–1) || Bleier (0–1) || — || loanDepot Park || 6,512 || 28–23
|- style="background:#fbb;"
| 52 || June 4 || @ Marlins || 4–5 || Scott (1–1) || Rogers (0–2) || — || loanDepot Park || 7,515 || 28–24
|- style="background:#bfb;"
| 53 || June 5 || @ Marlins || 5–1 || Junis (3–1) || Garrett (0–1) || — || loanDepot Park || 9,641 || 29–24
|- style="background:#fbb;"
| 54 || June 7 || Rockies || 3–5 || Márquez (2–5) || Littell (1–2) || Bard (12) || Oracle Park || 24,785 || 29–25
|- style="background:#bfb;"
| 55 || June 8 || Rockies || 2–1  || Doval (1–2) || Estévez (1–3) || — || Oracle Park || 21,535 || 30–25
|- style="background:#fbb;"
| 56 || June 9 || Rockies || 2–4 || Gomber (3–6) || Webb (5–2) || Colomé (3) || Oracle Park || 23,780 || 30–26
|- style="background:#bfb;"
| 57 || June 10 || Dodgers || 7–2 || Junis (4–1) || Buehler (6–3) || — || Oracle Park || 39,701 || 31–26
|- style="background:#bfb;"
| 58 || June 11 || Dodgers || 3–2 || Doval (2–2) || Kershaw (4–1) || Álvarez (1) || Oracle Park || 41,236 || 32–26
|- style="background:#bfb;"
| 59 || June 12 || Dodgers || 2–0 || Rodón (5–4) || Urías (3–6) || McGee (3) || Oracle Park || 41,197 || 33–26
|- style="background:#bfb;"
| 60 || June 13 || Royals || 6–2 || Wood (4–5) || Garrett (1–1) || — || Oracle Park || 22,185 || 34–26
|- style="background:#bfb;"
| 61 || June 14 || Royals || 4–2 || Webb (6–2) || Bubic (0–4) || Doval (9) || Oracle Park || 24,386 || 35–26
|- style="background:#fbb;"
| 62 || June 15 || Royals || 2–3 || Cuas (1–0) || Brebbia (3–1) || Barlow (7) || Oracle Park || 25,527 || 35–27
|- style="background:#bfb;"
| 63 || June 17 || @ Pirates || 2–0 || Rodón (6–4) || Thompson (3–5) || Doval (10) || PNC Park || 19,075 || 36–27
|- style="background:#bfb;"
| 64 || June 18 || @ Pirates || 7–5 || Wood (5–5) || Crowe (3–4) || Doval (11) || PNC Park || 26,041 || 37–27
|- style="background:#fbb;"
| 65 || June 19 || @ Pirates || 3–4 || Bednar (3–1) || Rogers (0–3) || — || PNC Park || 23,905 || 37–28
|- style="background:#fbb;"
| 66 || June 20 || @ Braves || 1–2 || Jansen (4–0) || Doval (1–2) || — || Truist Park || 40,589 || 37–29
|- style="background:#bfb;"
| 67 || June 21 || @ Braves || 12–10 || Rogers (1–3) || O'Day (1–1) || — || Truist Park || 35,384 || 38–29
|- style="background:#fbb;"
| 68 || June 22 || @ Braves || 3–4 || Minter (3–1) || McGee (1–2) || — || Truist Park || 38,478 || 38–30
|- style="background:#fbb;"
| 69 || June 23 || @ Braves || 6–7 || Wright (8–4) || Wood (5–6) || Jansen (19) || Truist Park || 36,870 || 38–31
|- style="background:#fbb;"
| 70 || June 24 || Reds || 2–4 || Ashcraft (4–1) || Cobb (3–3) || Strickland (3) || Oracle Park || 29,178 || 38–32
|- style="background:#bfb;"
| 71 || June 25 || Reds || 9–2 || Webb (7–2) || Minor (1–4) || — || Oracle Park || 40,115 || 39–32
|- style="background:#fbb;"
| 72 || June 26 || Reds || 3–10 || Mahle (3–6) || DeSclafani (0–2) || — || Oracle Park || 32,285 || 39–33
|- style="background:#bfb;"
| 73 || June 28 || Tigers || 4–3 || Rodón (7–4) || Skubal (5–6) || Doval (12) || Oracle Park || 28,004 || 40–33
|- style="background:#fbb;"
| 74 || June 29 || Tigers || 2–3 || García (3–2) || Wood (5–7) || Soto (15) || Oracle Park || 26,576 || 40–34
|-

|- style="background:#fbb;"
| 75 || July 1 || White Sox || 0–1 || Banks (1–0) || Doval (2–4) || Graveman (4) || Oracle Park || 35,266 || 40–35
|- style="background:#fbb;"
| 76 || July 2 || White Sox || 3–5 || Cease (7–3) || Webb (7–3) || Graveman (5) || Oracle Park || 30,804 || 40–36
|- style="background:#fbb;"
| 77 || July 3 || White Sox || 4–13 || Giolito (5–4) || Hjelle (0–1) || — || Oracle Park || 30,155 || 40–37
|- style="background:#fbb;"
| 78 || July 4 || @ Diamondbacks || 3–8 || Bumgarner (4–8) || Rodón (7–5) || — || Chase Field || 27,752 || 40–38
|- style="background:#fbb;"
| 79 || July 5 || @ Diamondbacks || 2–6 || Smith (1–1) || Leone (3–1) || — || Chase Field || 14,467 || 40–39
|- style="background:#bfb;"
| 80 || July 6 || @ Diamondbacks || 7–5 || Brebbia (4–1) || Mantiply (1–2) || Long (1) || Chase Field || 13,445 || 41–39
|- style="background:#fbb;"
| 81 || July 7 || @ Padres || 1–2  || Crismatt (5–1) || García (1–3)  || — || Petco Park || 42,656 || 41–40
|- style="background:#fbb;"
| 82 || July 8 || @ Padres || 3–6 || Snell (1–5) || Long (0–2) || Martinez (3) || Petco Park || 42,861 || 41–41
|- style="background:#bfb;"
| 83 || July 9 || @ Padres || 3–1 || Rodón (8–5) || García (4–5) || — || Petco Park || 41,714 || 42–41
|- style="background:#bfb;"
| 84 || July 10 || @ Padres || 12–0 || Wood (6–7) || Gore (4–4) || — || Petco Park || 38,712 || 43–41
|- style="background:#fbb;"
| 85 || July 11 || Diamondbacks || 3–4 || Kelly (8–5) || Cobb (3–4) || Melancon (12) || Oracle Park || 25,325 || 43–42
|- style="background:#bfb;"
| 86 || July 12 || Diamondbacks || 13–0 || Webb (8–3) || Keuchel (2–7) || — || Oracle Park || 23,353 || 44–42
|- style="background:#bfb;"
| 87 || July 13 || Diamondbacks || 4–3 || Doval (3–4) || Melancon (3–8) || — || Oracle Park || 27,055 || 45–42
|- style="background:#fbb;"
| 88 || July 14 || Brewers || 2–3  || Gott (2–2) || Doval (3–5) || Williams (6) || Oracle Park || 26,994 || 45–43
|- style="background:#bfb;"
| 89 || July 15 || Brewers || 8–5 || Long (1–2) || Hader (0–4) || — || Oracle Park || 28,244 || 46–43
|- style="background:#bfb;"
| 90 || July 16 || Brewers || 2–1 || Brebbia (5–1) || Suter (1–3) || Leone (2) || Oracle Park || 41,279 || 47–43
|- style="background:#bfb;"
| 91 || July 17 || Brewers || 9–5 || Webb (9–3) || Ashby (2–7) || — || Oracle Park || 30,584 || 48–43
|-style=background:#bbbfff
| – || July 19 || colspan="8"|92nd All-Star Game in Los Angeles, CA
|- style="background:#fbb;"
| 92 || July 21 || @ Dodgers || 6–9 || Phillips (4–3) || Leone (3–2) || Kimbrel (16) || Dodger Stadium || 53,165 || 48–44
|- style="background:#fbb;"
| 93 || July 22 || @ Dodgers || 1–5 || Vesia (2–0) || Long (1–3) || — || Dodger Stadium || 51,316 || 48–45
|- style="background:#fbb;"
| 94 || July 23 || @ Dodgers || 2–4 || Urías (9–6) || Wood (6–8) || Price (1) || Dodger Stadium || 47,749 || 48–46
|- style="background:#fbb;"
| 95 || July 24 || @ Dodgers || 4–7 || Phillips (5–3) || Leone (3–3) || Kimbrel (17) || Dodger Stadium || 47,505 || 48–47
|- style="background:#fbb;"
| 96 || July 25 || @ Diamondbacks || 0–7 || Kelly (10–5) || Junis (4–2) || — || Chase Field || 16,100 || 48–48
|- style="background:#fbb;"
| 97 || July 26 || @ Diamondbacks || 3–7 || Kennedy (4–4) || Rodón (8–6) || — || Chase Field || 16,989 || 48–49
|- style="background:#fbb;"
| 98 || July 27 || @ Diamondbacks || 3–5 || Ramirez (3–3) || Webb (9–4) || Melancon (14) || Chase Field || 17,043 || 48–50
|- style="background:#bfb;"
| 99 || July 28 || Cubs || 4–2 || Wood (7–8) || Steele (4–7) || Doval (17) || Oracle Park || 32,259 || 49–50
|- style="background:#fbb;"
| 100 || July 29 || Cubs || 2–4 || Stroman (3–5) || Cobb (3–5) || — || Oracle Park || 30,376 || 49–51
|- style="background:#bfb;"
| 101 || July 30 || Cubs || 5–4 || Rogers (2–3) || Smyly (3–6) || Leone (3) || Oracle Park || 40,971 || 50–51
|- style="background:#bfb;"
| 102 || July 31 || Cubs || 4–0 || Rodón (9–6) || Sampson (0–2) || — || Oracle Park || 33,622 || 51–51
|-

|- style="background:#fbb;"
| 103 || August 1 || Dodgers || 2–8 || Ferguson (1–0) || Webb (9–5) || — || Oracle Park || 34,865 || 51–52
|- style="background:#fbb;"
| 104 || August 2 || Dodgers || 5–9 || Anderson (12–1) || Wood (7–9) || — || Oracle Park || 32,798 || 51–53
|- style="background:#fbb;"
| 105 || August 3 || Dodgers || 0–3 || Urías (11–6) || Cobb (3–6) || Kimbrel (19) || Oracle Park || 35,400 || 51–54
|- style="background:#fbb;"
| 106 || August 4 || Dodgers || 3–5 || Martin (2–0) || Junis (4–3) || Kimbrel (20) || Oracle Park || 34,640 || 51–55
|- style="background:#bfb;"
| 107 || August 6 || @ Athletics || 7–3 || Rodón (10–6) || Oller (1–5) || — || Oakland Coliseum || 40,065 || 52–55
|- style="background:#bfb;"
| 108 || August 7 || @ Athletics || 6–4 || Webb (10–5) || Martínez (2–3) || Doval (14) || Oakland Coliseum || 31,605 || 53–55
|- style="background:#bfb;"
| 109 || August 8 || @ Padres || 1–0 || Wood (8–9) || Snell (4–6) || Doval (15) || Petco Park || 40,686 || 54–55
|- style="background:#fbb;"
| 110 || August 9 || @ Padres || 4–7 || Hill (3–0) || Rogers (2–4) || — || Petco Park || 38,626 || 54–56
|- style="background:#fbb;"
| 111 || August 10 || @ Padres || 7–13 || Suárez (3–1) || Marte (0–1) || — || Petco Park || 32,834 || 54–57
|- style="background:#bfb;"
| 112 || August 12 || Pirates || 5–3 || Rodón (11–6) || Wilson (2–7) || Doval (16) || Oracle Park || 33,328 || 55–57
|- style="background:#bfb;"
| 113 || August 13 || Pirates || 2–0 || Webb (11–5) || Beede (1–2) || Doval (17) || Oracle Park || 38,049 || 56–57
|- style="background:#bfb;"
| 114 || August 14 || Pirates || 8–7 || Doval (4–5) || Crowe (4–7) || — || Oracle Park || 36,471 || 57–57
|- style="background:#bfb;"
| 115 || August 15 || Diamondbacks || 6–1 || Cobb (4–6) || Bumgarner (6–12) || — || Oracle Park || 20,694 || 58–57
|- style="background:#bfb;"
| 116 || August 16 || Diamondbacks || 2–1 || Brebbia (6–1) || Kennedy (4–6) || — || Oracle Park || 20,897 || 59–57
|- style="background:#fbb;"
| 117 || August 17 || Diamondbacks || 2–3 || Ramirez (4–3) || Leone (3–4) || Melancon (17) || Oracle Park || 22,649 || 59–58
|- style="background:#fbb;"
| 118 || August 18 || Diamondbacks || 0–5 || Gallen (9–2) || Webb (11–6) || — || Oracle Park || 26,197 || 59–59
|- style="background:#fbb;"
| 119 || August 19 || @ Rockies || 4–7 || Ureña (2–4) || Wood (8–10) || Bard (25) || Coors Field || 31,604 || 59–60
|- style="background:#fbb;"
| 120 || August 20 || @ Rockies || 3–4  || Gilbreath (2–0) || Doval (4–6) || — || Coors Field || 35,278 || 59–61
|- style="background:#bfb;"
| 121 || August 21 || @ Rockies || 9–8  || Leone (4–4) || Bird (1–4) || Littell (1) || Coors Field || 30,682 || 60–61
|- style="background:#bfb;"
| 122 || August 23 || @ Tigers || 3–1 || Rodón (12–6) || Hutchison (1–7) || Doval (18) || Comerica Park || 21,123 || 61–61
|- style="background:#fbb;"
| 123 || August 24 || @ Tigers || 1–6 || Manning (1–1) || Webb (11–7) || — || Comerica Park || 17,400 || 61–62
|- style="background:#fbb;"
| 124 || August 26 || @ Twins || 0–9 || Ryan (10–6) || Wood (8–10) || — || Target Field || 25,246 || 61–63
|- style="background:#fbb;"
| 125 || August 27 || @ Twins || 2–3  || Durán (2–3) || Leone (4–5) || — || Target Field || 27,570 || 61–64
|- style="background:#fbb;"
| 126 || August 28 || @ Twins || 3–8 || Smeltzer (5–2) || Junis (4–2) || — || Target Field || 25,285 || 61–65
|- style="background:#fbb;"
| 127 || August 29 || Padres || 5–6 || Clevinger (5–5) || Rodón (12–7) || Martinez (7) || Oracle Park || 24,815 || 61–66
|- style="background:#fbb;"
| 128 || August 30 || Padres || 3–4 || Snell (6–7) || Webb (11–8) || Martinez (8) || Oracle Park || 28,267 || 61–67
|- style="background:#fbb;"
| 129 || August 31 || Padres || 4–5 || Musgrove (9–6) || Wood (8–12) || Hader (30) || Oracle Park || 25,298 || 61–68
|-

|- style="background:#bfb;"
| 130 || September 2 || Phillies || 13–1 || Cobb (5–6) || Gibson (9–6) || — || Oracle Park || 32,840 || 62–68
|- style="background:#bfb;"
| 131 || September 3 || Phillies || 5–4 || Littell (2–2) || Hand (3–2) || Doval (19) || Oracle Park || 40,010 || 63–68
|- style="background:#bfb;"
| 132 || September 4 || Phillies || 5–3 || Doval (5–6) || Robertson (3–2) || — || Oracle Park || 41,189 || 64–68
|- style="background:#bfb;"
| 133 || September 5 || @ Dodgers || 7–4 || Webb (12–8) || Heaney (2–2) || Doval (20) || Dodger Stadium || 51,887 || 65–68
|- style="background:#fbb;"
| 134 || September 6 || @ Dodgers || 3–6 || Anderson (14–3) || García (1–4) || Kimbrel (22) || Dodger Stadium || 39,752 || 65–69
|- style="background:#fbb;"
| 135 || September 7 || @ Dodgers || 3–7 || Phillips (6–3) || Littell (2–3) || — || Dodger Stadium || 39,237 || 65–70
|- style="background:#fbb;"
| 136 || September 8  || @ Brewers || 1–2 || Burnes (10–6) || Junis (4–5) || Williams (11) || American Family Field ||  || 65–71
|- style="background:#fbb;"
| 137 || September 8  || @ Brewers || 2–4 || Strzelecki (2–1) || Young (0–1) || Rogers (31) || American Family Field || 23,019 || 65–72
|- style="background:#fbb;"
| 138 || September 9 || @ Cubs || 2–4 || Smyly (6–8) || Rodón (12–8) || Hughes (4) || Wrigley Field || 31,309 || 65–73
|- style="background:#bfb;"
| 139 || September 10 || @ Cubs || 5–2 || Webb (13–8) || Stroman (3–7) || Doval (21) || Wrigley Field || 40,086 || 66–73
|- style="background:#bfb;"
| 140 || September 11 || @ Cubs || 4–2 || Littell (3–3) || Wesneski (1–1) || Doval (22) || Wrigley Field || 30,004 || 67–73
|- style="background:#bfb;"
| 141 || September 12 || Braves || 3–2 || Cobb (6–6) || Strider (10–5) || Alexander (1) || Oracle Park || 23,790 || 68–73
|- style="background:#fbb;"
| 142 || September 13 || Braves || 1–5 || Wright (18–5) || Junis (4–6) || — || Oracle Park || 24,872 || 68–74
|- style="background:#bfb;"
| 143 || September 14 || Braves || 4–1 || Rodón (13–8) || Morton (8–6) || Doval (23) || Oracle Park || 25,093 || 69–74
|- style="background:#fbb;"
| 144 || September 16 || Dodgers || 0–5 || May (2–2) || Webb (13–9) || — || Oracle Park || 37,487 || 69–75
|- style="background:#fbb;"
| 145 || September 17 || Dodgers || 2–7 || Urías (17–7) || Hjelle (0–2) || — || Oracle Park || 40,171 || 69–76
|- style="background:#fbb;"
| 146 || September 18 || Dodgers || 3–4  || Kimbrel (5–6) || Brebbia (6–2) || Bruihl (1) || Oracle Park || 32,137 || 69–77
|- style="background:#bfb;"
| 147 || September 19 || @ Rockies || 10–7  || Doval (6–6) || Hollowell (0–1) || Alexander (2) || Coors Field || 23,055 || 70–77
|- style="background:#bfb;"
| 148 || September 20 || @ Rockies || 6–3 || Rogers (3–4) || Freeland (9–10) || García (1) || Coors Field || 23,942 || 71–77
|- style="background:#bfb;"
| 149 || September 21 || @ Rockies || 6–1 || Webb (14–9) || Márquez (8–12) || — || Coors Field || 23,293 || 72–77
|- style="background:#bfb;"
| 150 || September 22 || @ Rockies || 3–0 || Cotton (3–2) || Ureña (3–7) || Doval (24) || Coors Field || 25,669 || 73–77
|- style="background:#bfb;"
| 151 || September 23 || @ Diamondbacks || 6–5 || Young (1–1) || Smith (1–3) || Doval (25) || Chase Field || 25,949 || 74–77
|- style="background:#fbb;"
| 152 || September 24 || @ Diamondbacks || 2–5 || Kelly (13–7) || Cobb (6–7) || Moronta (2) || Chase Field || 24,504 || 74–78
|- style="background:#bfb;"
| 153 || September 25 || @ Diamondbacks || 3–2 || Junis (5–6) || Frías (1–1) || Doval (26) || Chase Field || 25,389 || 75–78
|- style="background:#bfb;"
| 154 || September 27 || Rockies || 5–2 || Webb (15–9) || Márquez (8–13) || — || Oracle Park || 24,218 || 76–78
|- style="background:#bfb;"
| 155 || September 28 || Rockies || 6–3 || Hjelle (1–2) || Ureña (3–8) || — || Oracle Park || 22,663 || 77–78
|- style="background:#bfb;"
| 156 || September 29 || Rockies || 6–4 || Rodón (14–8) || Feltner (3–9) || Doval (27) || Oracle Park || 24,112 || 78–78
|- style="background:#bfb;"
| 157 || September 30 || Diamondbacks || 10–4 || Cobb (8–7) || Kelly (13–8) || — || Oracle Park || 28,478 || 79–78
|-

|- style="background:#fbb;"
| 158 || October 1 || Diamondbacks || 4–8 || Jameson (3–0) || Junis (5–7) || — || Oracle Park || 30,630 || 79–79
|- style="background:#bfb;"
| 159 || October 2 || Diamondbacks || 4–3  || Cotton (4–2) || Widener (0–1) || — || Oracle Park || 34,824 || 80–79
|- style="background:#fbb;"
| 160 || October 3 || @ Padres || 4–7 || Morejón (5–1) || Miller (0–1) || Hader (36) || Petco Park || 31,687 || 80–80
|- style="background:#fbb;"
| 161 || October 4 || @ Padres || 2–6 || Manaea (8–9) || Cobb (7–8) || — || Petco Park || 32,884 || 80–81
|- style="background:#bfb;"
| 162 || October 5 || @ Padres || 8–1 || Marte (1–1) || Stammen (1–2) || — || Petco Park || 32,064 || 81–81
|-

|- style="text-align:center;"
| Legend:       = Win       = Loss       = PostponementBold = Giants team member

Roster

Statistics
Updated through October 5.

Batting
Stats in bold are the team leaders.

Note: G = Games played; AB = At bats; R = Runs; H = Hits; 2B = Doubles; 3B = Triples; HR = Home runs; RBI = Runs batted in; BB = Walks; SO = Strikeouts; SB = Stolen bases; AVG = Batting average; OBP = On-base percentage; SLG = Slugging percentage; OPS = On base + slugging

Pitching
Stats in bold are the team leaders.

Note: W = Wins; L = Losses; ERA = Earned run average; G = Games pitched; GS = Games started; SV = Saves; IP = Innings pitched; H = Hits allowed; R = Runs allowed; ER = Earned runs allowed; BB = Walks allowed; K = Strikeouts

Farm system

Source:

References

External links
San Francisco Giants 2022 Schedule at MLB.com
2022 San Francisco Giants season at Baseball Reference

San Francisco Giants
San Francisco Giants seasons
San Francisco Giants